Invensys Ltd. was a multinational engineering and information technology company headquartered in London, United Kingdom. It was formed in 1999 through the merger of BTR plc and Siebe plc. It had offices in more than 50 countries and its products were sold in around 180 countries. The company was founded on 1 April 1920 as Siebe Gorman & Company Ltd and continued through various name changes registered at Companies House from that date. In January 2014 the company was taken over by the French multinational Schneider Electric for a total consideration of $5.5 billion. Schneider phased out the "Invensys" name in favour of its own.

Invensys lines of business were grouped into four segments: Software, Industrial Automation, Energy Controls and Appliance. Its brands included Avantis, Eurotherm, Foxboro, IMServ, InFusion, Triconex, SimSci, Skelta, Wonderware, Drayton, Eberle, Eliwell.

History
Invensys was formed through the merger of BTR plc and Siebe plc in 1999. From 1999 to 2004, it underwent a major restructuring programme to cut its costs as falling sales and large debts had led to the danger of its going bankrupt. A major disposal programme combined with a £2.7bn debt restructuring in 2004 saved it from collapse. During that time it bought and sold The Baan Corporation.

In March 2011, Wayne Edmunds, who had been chief financial officer since 2009, was appointed Chief Executive, replacing Ulf Henriksson. According to The Financial Times, Henriksson, who had been Chief Executive since 2005, had had differences with chairman Nigel Rudd over running the company, in spite of the return to financial health under Henriksson.

During 2011 and early 2012 the share price fell nearly 50%, in part due to delays costing £40 million in producing control and safety systems for eight Chinese nuclear reactors.

In July 2013 it was announced that Invensys was to be taken over by the French multinational Schneider Electric for a total consideration of £3.4 billion. The takeover was completed on 17 January 2014.

Operations
Invensys was organised into four main segments: Software, Industrial Automation, Energy Controls and Appliance.
Avantis
Avantis Enterprise Asset Management provides maintenance repair and operations including maintenance management, spares and inventory management, condition monitoring and procurement.

Eurotherm
Supplier of control measurement and data recording to industrial and process consumers.

Foxboro
Provides control systems addressing distributed and plant operations as well as measurement and instrument systems. Instruments include Pressure Transmitters, Coriolis Flow Meters, Valve Positioners, Buoyancy Level Transmitters and Temperature Transmitters.

IMServ Europe
IMServ Europe is a provider of energy management and data monitoring services. IMServ was previously part of Invensys Controls.

SimSci 
SimSci provides applications that help improve asset performance and utilisation with integrated simulation, optimisation, training, and process control software and services.

Skelta
Skelta BPM is a product for business process management.

Triconex
Triconex provides safety and critical control systems used in applications including Emergency Shutdown, Burner Management, Fire and Gas and Turbomachinery Control and Protection.

Wonderware
Wonderware provides software products to address production operations, production performance, manufacturing intelligence, business process management and collaboration.

See also

 List of companies based in London

References

External links
 Invensys on Schneider Electric website

Engineering companies of the United Kingdom
Defunct companies based in London
Technology companies established in 1999
British companies established in 1999
MES software
Schneider Electric